Gary Gow (born 24 January 1990) is a Scottish professional footballer who played for Hamilton Academical.

Career
He made his league debut for Hamilton against Dundee. He signed a new one-year contract with the club in May 2009.

He later played for Kirkintilloch Rob Roy.

References

Scottish Football League players
Hamilton Academical F.C. players
1990 births
Living people
Association football midfielders
Scottish footballers
Kirkintilloch Rob Roy F.C. players